Stretch is the ninth studio album by the American solo artist Scott Walker. It was released in November 1973 but was unsuccessful on the music charts. It was Walker's first solo album for CBS/Columbia records after departing from Philips Records.

The majority of the songs recorded for the album were covers of old songs, some of which were by songwriters Walker had covered before such as Randy Newman and Jimmy Webb. The one new song "Someone Who Cared" was written by the album's producer, Del Newman. The album was recorded in 1973 at Nova Studios, Marble Arch, London. The album was released as an LP in November 1973, and received negative reviews from most critics. The album was reissued and released on CD in 1997 by BGO Records coupled with Walker's tenth studio album 1974's We Had It All.

Reception

Stretch received negative reviews from the majority of critics.

Track listing

Release details

References

Scott Walker (singer) albums
1973 albums
Columbia Records albums
Albums produced by Del Newman